McNeilly is a station on the Overbrook branch of the Port Authority of Allegheny County's light rail network. It is located in Baldwin Township, Pennsylvania. The station features no parking or connecting buses, but is located on a crowded strip of small businesses and many area residents are within walking distance of the station, providing easy access to Downtown.

History
McNeilly was opened in 2004, one of eight new platform equipped stations which replaced 33 streetcar style stops along the Overbrook branch.

References

External links

Port Authority T Station listings
Station from Google Maps Street View

Port Authority of Allegheny County stations
Railway stations in the United States opened in 1901
Railway stations closed in 1993
Railway stations in the United States opened in 2004
Blue Line (Pittsburgh)
Silver Line (Pittsburgh)